Ana Laura Acuña Insfrán (born 5 May 1994) is a Paraguayan handball player for Nueva Estrella and the Paraguay national team.

She represented Paraguay at the 2013 World Women's Handball Championship in Serbia, where the Paraguayan team placed 21st.

Individual awards
2014 Pan American Women's Junior Handball Championship: All Star Team Left Back

References

Paraguayan female handball players
1994 births
Living people
20th-century Paraguayan women
21st-century Paraguayan women